Alginatibacterium is a Gram-negative, strictly aerobic and rod-shaped bacteria genus from the family of Alteromonadaceae with one known species (Alginatibacterium sediminis). Alginatibacterium sediminis has been isolated from coastal sediments.

References

Alteromonadales
Monotypic bacteria genera
Bacteria genera